Jerzy Ozdowski (1925–1994) was a Polish economist.

1925 births
1994 deaths
Knights of the Order of Polonia Restituta
20th-century  Polish economists